Judith Helen Martz (née Morstein; July 28, 1943 – October 30, 2017) was an American Republican Party politician, businesswoman, and Olympian speed skater who served as the 22nd governor of Montana from 2001 to 2005. She was the first and only woman to hold the office. She previously served as the 31st Lieutenant Governor of Montana from 1997 to 2001 under the governorship of Marc Racicot.

Early life and education
Martz was born July 28, 1943, in Big Timber, Montana, as Judith Helen Morstein. She graduated from Butte High School in 1961 and attended Eastern Montana College. Martz's father was a miner and rancher, and her mother was, at various times, a cook, liquor-store clerk and motel maid.

Career
Martz was a speed skater at the 1964 Olympics (1500 metres), 1962 Miss Rodeo Montana, and owner and operator, with her husband, Harry, of a garbage disposal service in her hometown of Butte, Montana. She was one of the first two Montana women to appear in the Olympics.

In 1996, Martz became the first female Lieutenant Governor of Montana, elected with Marc Racicot. She served as Lieutenant Governor from 1997 to 2001.

Governor of Montana

2000 Montana gubernatorial election

In the Montana gubernatorial election of 2000, Martz won the Republican primary over conservative activist and University of Montana law professor Rob Natelson 57 percent to 43 percent. She went on to defeat her Democratic opponent, State Auditor Mark O'Keefe, in the general election by a margin of 51 percent to 47 percent. She was Montana's first female governor.

Tenure (2001–2005)
Upon becoming governor, Martz's first legislative session resulted in the single largest increase in the education budget in Montana history, as well as tax cuts intended to stimulate the stagnant state economy.

Martz was put under a statewide microscope in November 2001 when a 1999 real estate deal between the Martzes and ARCO was uncovered. The Martz family had a ranch that adjoined another large parcel of land that was owned by the ARCO company, at that time ARCO sold that land at an allegedly low value to the Martz family. The state Democratic Party alleged that Martz had assisted ARCO in her position as Lieutenant Governor. However, the Montana Commissioner of Political Practices found that the allegations lacked merit.

Also during her term, her chief policy adviser, Shane Hedges, was involved in a drunk driving accident near Marysville, Montana, in August 2001, after which he went to Martz's residence, where she washed his clothes. House Majority Leader Paul Sliter died in the accident. Martz's policy advisor promptly resigned and pleaded guilty to a charge of negligent homicide.

Martz announced that she would not run for re-election as governor in 2004. Martz finished her time in office campaigning for President Bush in Ohio, Arizona, and other swing states, and sparring with incoming Democratic governor Brian Schweitzer over transition of state government.

Later career
In September 2005 Martz was named chair of Montanans for Judge Roberts, a group supportive of Supreme Court nominee John Roberts, and spoke at a rally in support of Roberts. She also sat on the boards of Maternal Life International, University of Montana Western, Big Sky State Games, and TASER International, a company that manufacturers non-lethal electrical shock equipment for law enforcement, the military, and private individuals.

She never ruled out another run for office, saying she would have to pray "long and hard" to make the decision.

Personal life
Martz and her husband, Harry, were married in 1965. They had two children: Justin and Stacey Jo.

In May 2003, Martz was referenced in news for a perceived similarity to the face and hair of a nude bordello dancer sculpted by Seattle artist Kristine Veith, and placed in a new development in downtown Helena. Both Martz and Veith deny the similarity, with Martz stating, possibly partially tongue-in-cheek, "I'm a very modest person, no one would ever see me like that. My husband doesn't ever see me like that".

On November 11, 2014, it was announced that Martz had stage II pancreatic cancer and was undergoing treatment in Arizona. She died of the disease on October 30, 2017, in Butte, Montana, at the age of 74.

Electoral history

See also
 List of female governors in the United States
 List of female lieutenant governors in the United States

References

External links
 Billings Gazette: Republicans back approval of Roberts
 CBS News: Bordello Gov. Judy
 

|-

|-

1943 births
2017 deaths
20th-century American politicians
20th-century American women politicians
21st-century American politicians
21st-century American women politicians
American athlete-politicians
American female speed skaters
American people of German descent
Republican Party governors of Montana
Lieutenant Governors of Montana
Montana State University Billings alumni
Olympic speed skaters of the United States
Politicians from Butte, Montana
People from Big Timber, Montana
Speed skaters at the 1964 Winter Olympics
Sportspeople from Butte, Montana
Women in Montana politics
Women state governors of the United States
Deaths from pancreatic cancer
Deaths from cancer in Montana